Catherine Cartan "CiCi" Bellis (born April 8, 1999) is an American former tennis player. In early 2018, she was the second youngest player in the top 100 of the WTA rankings. Bellis has a career-high of 35, which she achieved in August 2017. She is known for winning a match at the 2014 US Open as a 15 year old against a top-20 opponent, making her the youngest match-winner at the US Open since 1996.

Her biggest title came at the 2016 Hawaii Tennis Open, a WTA 125 event. She also won seven singles titles and two doubles titles on the ITF Circuit. Bellis had an accomplished junior season the same year she played in her first US Open, finishing the 2014 season as the ITF Junior World Champion for holding the year-end world No. 1 junior ranking. She also won the USTA National Junior Championship that year at 15 to become the youngest winner of the event since Lindsay Davenport in 1991.

Early life and background
CiCi was born in San Francisco to Gordon and Lori Bellis, and grew up in Hillsborough and Atherton in northern California. CiCi started playing tennis at age three, but only chose to focus on it over soccer when she was ten years old. When she was young, she was coached by former top-100 player Monique Javer. As a child, Bellis aspired to go to college at Stanford, but ended up declining a scholarship to turn pro due to her success as a teenager. Her tennis idol is Kim Clijsters.

Junior career

As a junior in the United States, Bellis won six USTA National Junior Singles Championships and was ranked No. 1 in the G18s in April, 2014.

Bellis began playing on the ITF Junior Circuit in late 2012 and mostly participated in low-level Grade-4 tournaments through the end of 2013. Her biggest triumph in the 2013 season was winning Les Petits As in France, a prestigious tournament for juniors between 12 and 14 years old.

In 2014, Bellis played only Grade-B1, Grade-1, and Grade-A tournaments, the three highest levels on the junior circuit. She had an impressive start to the year by reaching the final at her first five events, winning four of them. Specifically, she won the Copa del Café in Costa Rica, the USTA International Spring Championships and the Easter Bowl in the United States, and the Trofeo Bonfiglio in Italy. She followed up this success by also reaching the French Open doubles final with Markéta Vondroušová, which they lost in a match tiebreak. In contrast, Bellis struggled at the three Grand Slam singles events she entered that year, with her best result being a third round appearance at the French Open. Nonetheless, she took over the No. 1 ITF junior rank in early September on the strength of those four titles in the first half of the season.

In August 2014, Bellis won the USTA Girls' 18s National Championship, defeating Tornado Alicia Black in the final. At the age of 15 years and four months, she became the youngest winner of the event since Lindsay Davenport in 1991. With the victory, she also earned a wildcard into the main draw of the US Open. Bellis and Black were then both selected to represent the United States at the Junior Fed Cup along with Sofia Kenin. The trio won the title and Bellis went undefeated in seven matches. Later in the year, she also reached the semifinals at the Orange Bowl. Bellis finished the season as only the second American since 1982 to be No. 1 in the year-end girls' junior rankings, earning her the title of 2014 ITF World Champion.

Bellis closed out her junior career by reaching the semifinals at the 2015 French Open, her best singles result at a Grand Slam tournament and the only junior event she played that year.

Professional career

Early years: US Open match win

Bellis played her first few low-level professional events in early 2014, and won a doubles title at the $10k event in Orlando in March. She entered the 2014 US Open ranked No. 1208 with just two professional match wins in singles, both against players ranked outside the top 300. Nonetheless, she earned a wildcard into the tournament as the USTA junior national champion, making her the youngest woman in the main draw of a Grand Slam championship since Alizé Cornet at the 2005 French Open, and the youngest in the main draw of the US Open since 2004. In her WTA Tour-level debut, she upset 12th seed Dominika Cibulková, who was the runner-up at the Australian Open earlier in the year. With the victory, she became the youngest player to win a match at the US Open since Anna Kournikova reached the fourth round of the 1996 US Open at age 15. Bellis was also the youngest American to win a match at the US Open since Mary Joe Fernández in 1986. She was unable to win her next match, losing in three set loss to 20 year old Zarina Diyas in the second round.

A month after the US Open, Bellis won her first two professional titles in singles in back-to-back weeks, both in South Carolina at the $25k level. In 2015, Bellis was handed a wildcard into the main draw of the Miami Open, her first Premier Mandatory tournament. She avenged her US Open loss to Zarina Diyas in the second round, before losing to No. 1 eventual champion, Serena Williams. This helped Bellis crack the top 200 of the WTA rankings for the first time. She would reach a new career-high of No. 152 in the world during the summer. Towards the end of the year, Bellis attempted to qualify for the US Open but fell one match short.

2016: Top 100 debut, WTA 125 title

Bellis began the 2016 season ranked No. 248 and got off to a slow start. She did not return to the top 200 until the summer, after playing in the Stanford Classic, a Premier tournament. Bellis received a wildcard into the main draw and defeated No. 38, Jeļena Ostapenko, and compatriot Sachia Vickery, before losing to top seed Venus Williams. This was also her first WTA Tour quarterfinal. The following month, Bellis successfully qualified for the main draw of the US Open. She then improved on her result from two years earlier by reaching the third round, where she lost to the eventual champion Angelique Kerber, in straight sets. Her performance at the US Open took her to a new career-high ranking of No. 120 and helped convince her to turn professional.

In her first tournament as a pro, Bellis entered the Tournoi de Québec and reached another WTA quarterfinal. Towards the end of the season, Bellis caught fire and won her final three tournaments of the year. This included two $50K titles in Canada at Saguenay and Toronto, which brought her into the top 100 for the first time. Bellis then extended her match win streak to 14 with a WTA 125 title at the Hawaii Open in Honolulu. She capped off the tournament with a win over world No. 23 Zhang Shuai in the final, the second highest ranked player she ever defeated. Bellis finished the year ranked No. 75 and the only player under 18 in the top 100.

2017: Top 50, Newcomer of the Year

Bellis was forced to skip the Australian hard-court season in January due to left leg problems with her hip and hamstring. She played her first main draw of the year at the Dubai Championships, where she made her first Premier 5-quarterfinal and extended her main-draw win streak at all levels to 17 matches. In the third round, she defeated world No. 6, Agnieszka Radwańska, for her first top-ten victory before falling to Caroline Wozniacki. The upset made Bellis the youngest American to defeat a top-ten opponent since 2009.

Bellis played in her first WTA Tour clay-court season and reached quarterfinals at the Rabat Grand Prix in Morocco. She made another third-round appearance at a Grand Slam tournament at the French Open and became just the third American aged 18-or-under to make it this far at the major in Paris since the turn of the century. Bellis also had a strong grass-court season with her first WTA semifinal at the Mallorca Open. This success away from the hard courts took her to No. 40 in the WTA rankings.

For the second straight year, Bellis had a great tournament at the Bank of the West Classic. She dropped just two games against No. 14 Petra Kvitová to get to the semifinals, where she lost to compatriot CoCo Vandeweghe. She played at the Rogers Cup and recorded a second top-ten victory, this time over No. 8 Svetlana Kuznetsova. This helped her reach a career-high of No. 35 in the world in mid-August. She then finished the season on a five match losing-streak. Nonetheless, Bellis won the WTA Newcomer of the Year award for her rankings achievement and her solid performance across all surfaces.

2018: Plagued by injuries
Bellis defeated world No. 5, Karolína Plíšková, and reached the quarterfinals at the Qatar Ladies Open. Recurring wrist and elbow injuries sidelined Bellis after March. Bellis eventually had four surgeries in June, September, November and March of 2019 on her wrist, arm and elbow.

2019–2020: Comeback & retirement
Bellis returned to tennis in November 2019 at the Houston Challenger after 18 months away from the game while she recovered from injuries. She lost in the third round to the eventual champion, Kirsten Flipkens.

At the 2020 Australian Open, Bellis defeated 22nd ranked Karolína Muchová in the second round, before falling to world No. 17, Elise Mertens.

Having competed her last match on the ITF Circuit in November 2020 in Charleston, she announced her retirement on Instagram on January 19th, 2022.

Grand Slam performance timelines

Singles

Doubles

WTA Challenger finals

Singles: 1 (title)

ITF Circuit finals

Singles: 8 (7 titles, 1 runner–up)

Doubles: 2 (2 titles)

Junior Grand Slam tournament finals

Girls' doubles: 1 (runner–up)

Head-to-head record

Record against top 10 players
Bellis' match record against players who have been ranked in the top 10, former No. 1 in bold.

  Bianca Andreescu 1–0
  Timea Bacsinszky 1–0
  Dominika Cibulková 1–0
  Sara Errani 1–0
  Madison Keys 1–0
  Johanna Konta 1–0
  Svetlana Kuznetsova 1–0
  Petra Kvitová 1–0
  Carla Suárez Navarro 1–0
  Julia Görges 1–1
  Daria Kasatkina 1–1
  Jeļena Ostapenko 1–1
  Karolína Plíšková 1–1
  Agnieszka Radwańska 1–1
  Kiki Bertens 1–2
  Ashleigh Barty 0–1
  Caroline Garcia 0–1
  Simona Halep 0–1
  Angelique Kerber 0–1
  Garbiñe Muguruza 0–1
  Aryna Sabalenka 0–1
  CoCo Vandeweghe 0–1
  Serena Williams 0–1
  Venus Williams 0–1
  Victoria Azarenka 0–2
  Caroline Wozniacki 0–2

Wins over top-10 players
Bellis is currently  against top 10 players who were in the top 10 at the moment of the match.

References

External links

 
 

1999 births
Living people
American female tennis players
Tennis players from San Francisco
People from Atherton, California
21st-century American women